Beat Up may refer to:

Beat Up, a 1984 7" single album by American band The Toasters
"Beat Up", a 2000 episode of Japanese television series Mirai Sentai Timeranger
"Beat Up", a 2006 remix by German band KMFDM
"Beat Up", a 2007 entry in Japanese manga series Petit Eva: Evangelion@School
"Beat Up", a 2008 song by British band Mock & Toof
"Beat Up", a song by American singer Izzy Stradlin on his 2010 album Wave of Heat

See also

Beat 'em up, a video game genre
 Upbeat (disambiguation) 
Beat It Up (disambiguation)
Beat Me Up (disambiguation)
Beat You Up (disambiguation)
Up (disambiguation)
Beat (disambiguation)